The Royal Hibernian Academy (RHA) is an artist-based and artist-oriented institution in Ireland, founded in Dublin in 1823. Like many other Irish institutions, such as the RIA, the academy retained the word "Royal" after most of Ireland became independent as the Irish Free State in December 1922.

History
The RHA was founded as the result of 30 Irish artists petitioning the government for a charter of incorporation. According to the letters patent of 5 August 1823, The Royal Hibernian Academy of Painting, Sculpture, and Architecture was established, which included a National School of Art. The first elected president was the landscape painter, William Ashford. In 1824 architect Francis Johnston was made president.  He had provided headquarters for the RHA at Academy House in Lower Abbey Street at his own expense.  The first exhibitions took place in May 1825 and were held annually from then on. To encourage interest in the arts works displayed at the RHA were distributed by lot as prizes among subscribers. Works by Frederick William Burton, Daniel Maclise, J. M. W. Turner and David Wilkie, among others, were presented in this way. The exhibitions and school prospered and by the end of the 19th century the RHA was the leading Irish institution involved in promoting visual arts. Academy House was destroyed by fire in 1916 during the Easter Rising; over 500 pieces of art, including from artists Jack Butler Yeats, Madeline Green and John Lavery, were lost.

In the middle of the twentieth century, the RHA was seen as reactionary, hindering the development of modernism in Ireland and the Irish Exhibition of Living Art was founded in 1943 to challenge the RHA's own exhibition policies . This has changed since the 1990s, Louis le Brocquy one of the founders of the Irish Exhibition of Living Art was a member of the Honorary Council of the Academy and the RHA's own mission statement states that it is dedicated to developing, affirming and challenging the public's appreciation and understanding of traditional and innovative approaches to the visual arts. The gallery is now one of the premier contemporary Art spaces in Ireland, exhibiting a wide range of contemporary art practice in its annual programmes while respecting traditional art forms.

In the 1970s the RHA constructed a new building in Ely Place in Dublin. This building replaced the gallery's previous premises, a Victorian house that had been home to Oliver St. John Gogarty. This was demolished and the property developer, Matt Gallagher, agreed to build a modern gallery on the site for the RHA. After the sudden death of Gallagher in January 1974, it emerged that he had left no provision in his will for the completion of the gallery. The building lay unfinished for a number of years before it was completed. The building was closed between 2007 and 2009 for renovations. This building houses six galleries; here the Academy mounts the annual exhibition. In addition, the Academy curates frequent exhibitions and frequently is responsible for major retrospectives of the work of Irish artists. The Academy has a large collection of Irish art, but this is not on display.

In 2009 the RHA refounded its school, the RHA drawing school. In Ely Place it has a large drawing studio and 6 studios which are available to artists through open submissions. Other studios are also administered by the school, such as the Tony O'Malley residency in Kilkenny. It runs TUD accredited courses (since 2018) in Painting and drawing techniques delivered by a faculty made up of Academy members and others artists. Current tutors are Colin Martin RHA (principal), Mick O'Dea PPRHA,  Una Sealy RHA, Blaise Smith RHA, Geraldine O'Neill RHA, Sahoko Blake, Conor Walton, Raphael Hynes and Sean Molloy among others. It also holds workshops with international tutors and self-directed life-drawing sessions.

The Academy is funded by: the Arts Council of Ireland (An Chomhairle Ealaíon), through revenue from its Annual Exhibition, and from Benefactors, Patrons and Friends of the Academy.

Selected exhibitions 

The RHA has held an annual exhibition – an open submission art show – since 1826.  It is "the largest in Ireland and the longest-running".

FUTURES (originally EuroJet Futures) is an ongoing series of exhibitions featuring selected emerging artists from Ireland.  It began in 2001 and has had three series – each with annual exhibitions.  Additionally each series has had an 'anthology' presenting all of the artists from that series together.

See also
Irish art
 Current RHA members and membership procedures http://www.rhagallery.ie/about/members/

References

Further reading

External links 
 http://www.rhagallery.ie/

 
Art museums and galleries in the Republic of Ireland
Learned societies of Ireland
Museums in Dublin (city)
Academies of arts
1823 in art
1823 establishments in Ireland
Organizations established in 1823